Yuste is a Spanish surname of basque language origin. Maybe from Navarre, La Rioja or Guipuzcoa.

References to Yuste as a place refer to the village now called Cuacos de Yuste in Spain, where the Monastery of Yuste, last home of Charles V, is situated. 

 Antonio Pérez Yuste is a Spanish engineer.
 Carmelo Yuste Yuste is a Spanish football player.
 Daniel Yuste is a Spanish cyclist.
 Héctor Yuste is a Spanish football player.
 Rafael Yuste is a Spanish neuroscientist.